Johann Carl Megerle von Mühlfeld   was a scientist and zoologist who lived from 1765 to 1842.

He worked at the Vienna natural history museum, the Naturhistorisches Museum, Wien, until he retired at the end of 1835..

He took care of the minerals and part of the Mollusc Collection, working with Andreas Xaverius Stütz. They carried out a task that all the other co-workers had avoided until then, which was the inventory-taking of specimens from the geosphere.

Megerle von Mühlfeld organized the Natural History Collection and became a custodian in 1797. In 1806 the museum purchased his collection of European insects, and he became the first curator of insects. He organised the purchase of the Gundian collection of European butterflies.

The old collections, including his specimens, were destroyed in October 1848 during a Hofburg fire.

Among the taxa Mergerle von Mühlfeld described are:

 Melolontha pectoralis, a kind of cockchafer beetle
 The bivalve genera Angulus, Chione and Corbicula, all in 1811 
 The snail species Helix perspectiva in 1816 (now known as Discus perspectivus).

The brachiopod genus Megerlia King, 1850 is probably named after him, as well as the odostomiine snail species Odostomia megerlei Locard, 1886.

His manuscripts are held at the Staatsbibliothek zu Berlin.

References

Further reading
 Megerle von Mühlfeld, J.C. (1816). Beschreibung einiger neuen Conchylien. Magazin der Gesellschaft Naturforschender Freunde zu Berlin 8(1):4.

Austrian entomologists
1765 births
1842 deaths